The Rolling Stones' 1970 European Tour was a concert tour of Continental Europe that took place during the late summer and early autumn 1970.

History
This was the Stones' first tour in Europe since 1967, and became part of a pattern (not always followed) wherein the group would play North America, continental Europe, and the United Kingdom on a three-year rotating cycle.

Shows were similar to that of the 1969 American Tour, but with the material more familiar to audiences as Let It Bleed had now been out for some months.  The Stones continued to preview new material, however, as "Brown Sugar", "Dead Flowers", and "You Gotta Move" were set list regulars; they would not appear on record until Sticky Fingers was released a half year later. Unlike many of the group's tours of this era, here the group only played one show a night with only one exception (Milan). The band played "Gimme Shelter" only once, in Malmo, Sweden (the first show of the tour). It can be heard on the bootleg Secrets Travel Fast, and features solos by Keith Richards, Bobby Keys, and Mick Taylor.

Following a tradition set since the band's earliest days, the tour was not without its altercations. The show at Råsunda stadion in Stockholm on 4 September was interrupted by police who feared that fans, provoked by Jagger, would storm the stage. The singer duly responded by pointing the microphone to the police on stage and soon after suggested the audience would sit down for the next song (the slower "Love in Vain"). On 14 September a thousand or so forged tickets were rejected at a show at Ernst-Merck-Halle in Hamburg; two hundred policemen were needed to handle disappointed fans. Two days later at Deutschlandhalle in West Berlin, there were nasty battles between assorted youths and the police before the show, and some 50 arrests were made. Then on 1 October at Milan's Palazzo Dello Sport, two thousand youths tried to crash the gates to get into the show. Police had to use tear gas to quell the riot; there were injuries among both the cops and the crowd, and 63 arrests were made.

No live recordings of the tour have been officially released; there is only one known soundboard recording from Paris.

Personnel

The Rolling Stones
Mick Jagger – lead vocals, harmonica
Keith Richards – guitar, backing vocals
Mick Taylor – guitar
Bill Wyman – bass guitar
Charlie Watts – drums

Additional musicians
Ian Stewart – piano
Bobby Keys – saxophone
Jim Price – trumpet, trombone
Stephen Stills - Piano (Only on 9 October, most likely for the entire show)

Tour set list

The fairly typical set list for the tour was:

"Jumpin' Jack Flash"
"Roll Over Beethoven"
"Sympathy for the Devil"
"Stray Cat Blues"
"Love in Vain"
"Prodigal Son"
"You Gotta Move"
"Dead Flowers"
"Midnight Rambler"
"Live With Me"
"Let It Rock"
"Little Queenie"
"Brown Sugar"
"Honky Tonk Women"
"Street Fighting Man"

Tour dates

References

 Carr, Roy.  The Rolling Stones: An Illustrated Record.  Harmony Books, 1976.

External links
 'Rocks Off' 1970 tour setlists
 'Frayed' 1970 tour pages

The Rolling Stones concert tours
1970 concert tours
1970 in Europe
Concert tours of Europe